Consuelo Rodriguez is a paralympic athlete from Mexico competing mainly in category THS2 throwing events.

Consuelo was part of the Mexican paralympic team that travelled to Barcelona for the 1992 Summer Paralympics.  There she competed in all three throws winning the bronze medal in the shot put.

References

External links
 

Paralympic athletes of Mexico
Athletes (track and field) at the 1992 Summer Paralympics
Paralympic bronze medalists for Mexico
Living people
Medalists at the 1992 Summer Paralympics
Year of birth missing (living people)
Paralympic medalists in athletics (track and field)
Mexican female shot putters
Shot putters with limb difference
Paralympic shot putters